The Ueno–Tokyo Line, formerly known as the Tōhoku Through Line is a railway line in Tokyo, Japan, operated by the East Japan Railway Company (JR East), linking Ueno Station and Tokyo Station, extending the services of the Utsunomiya Line, the Takasaki Line, and the Jōban Line southward and onto the Tōkaidō Main Line and vice versa. The project began in May 2008. The line opened with the 14 March 2015 timetable revision, with the project costing about JPY 40 billion.

Direct travel was expected to ease congestion on the Yamanote Line and  Keihin–Tōhoku Line, and the travel time was reduced to 7 to 10 minutes because of through trains between the lines of Utsunomiya and Takasaki and the Main Line of Tokaido in addition to through trains that pass the Shinagawa Station on the Joban Line.

Route

The gap was reconnected by a new  top deck on the existing Shinkansen viaduct near Kanda Station with ramps at either end up from the existing formations. Provision was made during construction of the Shinkansen link for eventual restoration of through traffic on the Tohoku Lines.
JR East built train turnback facilities at Shinagawa Station on the Tōkaidō Line, allowing through trains from Ueno to terminate there and return north.

Services
Trains from the Utsunomiya Line, Takasaki Line, and Jōban Line run non-stop between Ueno and Tokyo Station and continue on the Tōkaidō Line towards  (all trains departing the Jōban Line terminate here), Ōfuna, Hiratsuka, Kōzu, Odawara, Atami, Numazu in the JR Central Tōkaidō Main Line and Itō in the Itō Line. Initially, up to 15 services per hour run during the morning peak, increased to 20 per hour in 2016. Joban Line limited express services (Hitachi limited-stop and Tokiwa semi-fast) were extended south of Ueno via the Ueno–Tokyo Line, with most services terminating at Shinagawa Station.

History
The Tōhoku Main Line ran to Tokyo station both prior to and following World War II. Although the connector between Ueno and Tokyo was only used for freight trains and forwarding at first, the Allied occupation forces ran passenger trains from Tokyo Station through the Tohoku Main Line following World War II, and this was followed by a number of through services from the 1950s until the 1970s. The connection between Ueno and Tokyo was closed to passenger service in April 1973, and to freight service in January 1983; the portion of the line around Akihabara and Kanda was dismantled to provide a right-of-way to extend the Tōhoku Shinkansen to Tokyo Station, with through services to Tokyo station commencing in 1991.

A government panel recommendation in 2000 suggested restoring the connector between Ueno and Tokyo by 2015, and JR East officially announced the project on 27 March 2002.

The project received support from various local governments, particularly in Saitama Prefecture, Ibaraki Prefecture, and other areas to the north of Tokyo. However, residents of the area immediately surrounding the project cited light blockage and earthquake risk, and applied to a Tokyo court for an injunction against construction in 2007. The lawsuit was dismissed in 2012.

The project was originally scheduled to be completed in fiscal 2013, but completion was delayed by the effects of the 2011 Tōhoku earthquake and tsunami.

Station list

Future developments

In January 2014, JR East president Tetsuro Tomita indicated that the company was considering the possibility of linking the Ueno–Tokyo Line in the future with a new direct access line to Haneda Airport also under consideration. Although there had been discussion of completing this extension prior to the 2020 Olympics, the line is currently set to start construction in 2022 for completion in 2029.

See also
 Shōnan–Shinjuku Line, a similar line on the west side of Tokyo

References

External links
  

Lines of East Japan Railway Company
Tōhoku Main Line
Railway lines in Tokyo
Railway lines opened in 2015
2015 establishments in Japan
1067 mm gauge railways in Japan